Charles Greenway, 1st Baron Greenway (13 June 1857 – 17 December 1934), known as Sir Charles Greenway, 1st Baronet, from 1919 to 1927, was a British businessman.

Greenway was the son of John David Greenway of Taunton in Somerset. He was a senior partner in the firm of Shaw Wallace & Co of India and Ceylon and of R. G. Shaw & Co of London.

He became associated with the Burmah Oil Company, and later joined forces with William Knox D'Arcy, of the Mount Morgan Mining Company, in developing the oil concessions d'Arcy had won from the Persian government. Together, and with capital from the British Government, they founded the Anglo-Persian Oil Company, which made the Empire largely independent of other powers in the supply of petroleum, which had become of vital strategic importance. He resisted post-War pressure to privatize the company, to the great benefit of the Treasury.

Greenway was created Baronet of Wenhaston in the County of Suffolk, in 1919, and in 1927 retired as chairman of Anglo-Persian Oil, and in recognition of his service to the nation was raised to the peerage as Baron Greenway, of Stanbridge Earls in the County of Southampton.

Family
Lord Greenway married Mabel, daughter of Edwin Augustine Tower, in 1883. He died in December 1934, aged 77, and was succeeded in his titles by his son Charles. Lady Greenway died in 1940. Thomas John Greenway, a prominent mining metallurgist in Australia, was a brother.

References

Kidd, Charles, Williamson, David (editors). Debrett's Peerage and Baronetage (1990 edition). New York: St Martin's Press, 1990, 

1857 births
1934 deaths
Barons in the Peerage of the United Kingdom
Anglo-Persian Oil Company
British businesspeople in the oil industry
English businesspeople
BP people
Barons created by George V